The men's 100 metre butterfly event at the 2012 Summer Olympics took place on 2–3 August at the London Aquatics Centre in London, United Kingdom.

As the most decorated Olympian of all time, Michael Phelps continued to ramp up his already astonishing resume with an unprecedented second Olympic three-peat and another title defense. Rallying from seventh at the halfway turn, he produced a remarkable swim over the rest of the field to claim his seventeenth gold and twenty-first career medal in 51.21. Trailing behind Phelps by 0.23 seconds, South Africa's Chad le Clos and Russia's Yevgeny Korotyshkin tied for the silver in a matching time of 51.44.

Leading early at the turn, Serbia's Milorad Čavić, who famously lost to Phelps in Beijing four years earlier by a fingertip, faded down the stretch to match Germany's Steffen Deibler with a fourth-place time in 51.81. Netherlands' Joeri Verlinden (51.82), U.S. swimmer Tyler McGill (51.88), and Poland's Konrad Czerniak (52.05) also vied for an Olympic medal to round out a historic finish.

Austria's Dinko Jukic (51.99), fourth-place finalist in the 200 m butterfly few days earlier; and Kenya's Jason Dunford (52.16), fifth in Beijing, missed the final roster after placing ninth and sixteenth respectively in the semifinals. Other notable swimmers featured Japan's Takeshi Matsuda, who elected not to do a swimoff with Germany's Benjamin Starke (a matching time of 52.36) on the morning prelims; his teammate Takuro Fujii (52.49) and Papua New Guinea's Ryan Pini (52.68), both of whom finished sixth and eighth in Beijing; and Sweden's 2000 champion Lars Frölander, who posted a twentieth-place time of 52.47 in his sixth Olympics.

Records 
Prior to this competition, the existing world and Olympic records were:

Results

Heats

Semifinals

Semifinal 1

Semifinal 2

Final

References

External links
NBC Olympics Coverage

Men's 00100 metre butterfly
Men's 100 metre butterfly
Men's events at the 2012 Summer Olympics